Crud or CRUD may refer to:

 Waste, dirt, feces, or something of poor quality
 Create, read, update, and delete (CRUD), basic functions of a computer database
 Crud (game), a game played on a billiard table
 CRUD (radio station), a former radio station of Rochdale College in Toronto, Canada
 "Crud", a song by British rapper Ghetts from his 2021 album Conflict of Interest

See also
 Crud Puppy, a fictional character